Bengt Morberg (1 June 1897 – 26 September 1968) was a Swedish gymnast who competed at the 1920 Summer Olympics. He was part of the Swedish team that won the gold medal in the Swedish system event.

References

1897 births
1968 deaths
Swedish male artistic gymnasts
Gymnasts at the 1920 Summer Olympics
Olympic gymnasts of Sweden
Olympic gold medalists for Sweden
Olympic medalists in gymnastics
Medalists at the 1920 Summer Olympics
Sportspeople from Västerås